Elena Valentinovna Shadrina (born 26 March 1982) is a Russian weightlifter. She competed at the 2013 World Championships in the Women's 58 kg, winning a bronze medal. She won the bronze medal at the 2008 Asian Weightlifting Championships.

Major results

References

External links
 

1982 births
Living people
Russian female weightlifters
World Weightlifting Championships medalists
European Weightlifting Championships medalists
21st-century Russian women